Daniel Walter Chorzempa (born December 7, 1944) is an American organist, composer and architect.

Biography
Chorzempa was born in Minneapolis, Minnesota, and subsequently studied music and architecture at the University of Minnesota and further music studies in Cologne. After starting out as a pianist (achieving some success in Europe during the late 1960s and early 1970s), he became better known as an organist. In the 1970s he was also active as a composer associated with the Cologne School and New Simplicity.

Footnotes

References

External links
Daniel Chorzempa web site
 Daniel Chorzempa reminisces with Southern African tour organiser by Hans Adler, 1978.

1944 births
Living people
American classical organists
Musicians from Minneapolis
Academic staff of Mozarteum University Salzburg
American male organists
University of Minnesota alumni
Classical musicians from Minnesota
21st-century organists
21st-century American male musicians
21st-century American keyboardists
Male classical organists